Yevgeni Nikolayevich Kuzka (born 27 May 1969) is a former Russian professional football player.

Club career
He made his Russian Football National League debut for FC Dynamo Stavropol on 7 August 1997 in a game against FC Luch Vladivostok.

Honours
 Russian Third League Zone 2 top scorer: 1994 (23 goals).

External links
 

1969 births
Sportspeople from Lipetsk
Living people
Soviet footballers
Russian footballers
FC Dynamo Stavropol players
FC Spartak Tambov players
FC Metallurg Lipetsk players
FC Vityaz Podolsk players
Association football forwards
Association football midfielders
FC Spartak Ryazan players